USS LST-842 was an  in the United States Navy. Like many of her class, she was not named and is properly referred to by her hull designation.

LST-842 was laid down on 9 October 1944 at Ambridge, Pennsylvania, by the American Bridge Company; launched on 24 November 1944; sponsored by Mrs. F. T. Hulet; and commissioned on 19 December 1944.

Service history
During World War II, LST-842 was assigned to the Asiatic-Pacific theater and participated in the assault and occupation of Okinawa Gunto in June 1945. Following the war, the ship performed occupation duty in the Far East until mid-September 1945. She was decommissioned on 30 December 1947, and transferred to the Philippine government to serve as BRP Pampanga. On 22 January 1948, the tank landing ship was struck from the Navy list.

LST-842 earned one battle star for World War II service.

References

 
 

 

LST-542-class tank landing ships
World War II amphibious warfare vessels of the United States
Ships built in Ambridge, Pennsylvania
1944 ships
Korean War amphibious warfare vessels of the Philippines
Ships transferred from the United States Navy to the Philippine Navy